Sir James Horace Barnes,  (14 December 1891 – 4 February 1969) was an English civil servant. Educated at Merton College, Oxford, he entered the civil service in 1919 as an official in the Air Ministry. He was Deputy Director of Civil Aviation from 1940 to 1941 and the Joint Deputy Under Secretary of State from 1943 to 1945, when he became the sole Deputy Under Secretary. He was subsequently Permanent Secretary of the Air Ministry from 1947 from 1955. At the time of his retirement, he was the only official to have worked closely with every Chief of the Air Staff to date.

References 

1891 births
1969 deaths
English civil servants
Alumni of Merton College, Oxford
Knights Companion of the Order of the Bath
Knights Commander of the Order of the British Empire